Pay Tabs is a financial services company based in Saudi Arabia.

Pay Tabs was established in 2014 by Abdulaziz Al Jouf, a Saudi entrepreneur. PayTabs is headquartered in Saudi Arabia with its other offices in UAE, Egypt India and Turkey.

American fintech company Payoneer partnered with PayTabs in 2019. In 2020, EFG Hermes, an Egyptian financial services company partnerred with PayTabs. In April 2020, MBME Pay partnered with PayTabs to launch bill payment app Govera. In 2021, PayTabs partnered with Visa.

In Nov 2022, PayTabs acquired Digital Pay, a POS machine based B2B Digital Platform in Saudi Arabia.

The company operates in ten markets, across the Middle East, Africa, and South Asia, including Saudi Arabia, U.A.E. and Egypt.

Awards 
Middle East’s Leaders in Fintech Awards 2021

References 

Companies established in 2014
Financial services companies